KVCI (89.7 FM) is a radio station licensed to Montezuma, Iowa, United States. The station airs a Christian format, and is an owned and operated affiliate of VCY America.

History
The station began broadcasting in late 2009, and held the call sign KRNF. It was owned by American Radio Missions Foundation and aired a country gospel format branded "God's Country", and carried VCY America's Music 'Til Dawn overnight. In 2015, the station was sold to VCY America for $251,000, and its call sign was changed to KVCI. In 2020, the station's ERP was increased to 100,000 watts, broadcasting from a new location near Bussey, Iowa.

References

External links

VCI
VCY America stations
Radio stations established in 2009
2009 establishments in Iowa